The 1967–68 Serie A season was won by Milan.

Teams
Sampdoria and Varese had been promoted from Serie B.

Six out of the sixteen clubs came from Lombardy, a record for a single region of Italy.

Final classification

Results

Top goalscorers

References and sources
Almanacco Illustrato del Calcio - La Storia 1898-2004, Panini Edizioni, Modena, September 2005

External links
  - All results on RSSSF Website.

Serie A seasons
Italy
1967–68 in Italian football leagues